Gibberula judithae is a species of sea snail, a marine gastropod mollusk, in the family Cystiscidae.

Distribution
This species occurs in Canaries.

References

judithae
Gastropods described in 2017